Lladó is a surname. Notable people with the surname include:

Amadeo Lladós (born 1991), Spanish motorcycle racer
Jaime Lladó Lumbera (1916—?), Spanish chess player
José Lladó Fernández-Urrutia (born 1934), Spanish politician and businessman
Juan Lladó (1918–1956), Spanish screenwriter and film director